The Eminent Ecologist Award is prize awarded annually to a senior ecologist in recognition of an outstanding contribution to the science of ecology. The prize is awarded by the Ecological Society of America. According to the statutes, the recipient may be from any country in the world. However, in practice very few non-U.S. citizens have received the award. The awardee receives lifetime membership in the society.

Recipients
Source: ESA
 2022 Jianguo Liu
2021 Steward T. A. Pickett, 
2020 Monica G. Turner, 
2019 Robert Holt,  
2018 F. Stuart Chapin III,  
2017 Diana Harrison Wall, 
2016 Jerry F. Franklin, 
2015 Eric R. Pianka, 
2014 Jane Lubchenco, 
2013 William A. Reiners, 
2012 Robert J. Naiman, 
2011 Thomas G. Whitham, 
2010 Simon A. Levin, 
2009 Stephen P. Hubbell, 
2008 Michael Rosenzweig, 
2007 Otto Ludwig Lange, 
2006 Daniel Simberloff, 
2005 Lawrence B. Slobodkin, 
2004 Samuel J. McNaughton, 
2003 Richard B. Root, 
2002 Charles J. Krebs, 
2001 Paul R. Ehrlich, 
2000 Robert Treat Paine, 
1999 Crawford S. Holling, 
1998 Gordon Orians, 
1997 Frances C. James, 
1996 Harold A. Mooney, 
1995 Gene E. Likens and Frederick Herbert Bormann, 
1994 Edward Osborne Wilson, 
1993 Margaret Bryan Davis, 
1992 Frank A. Pitelka, 
1991 W. Dwight Billings and Nelson George Hairston, 
1990 William Edwin Ricker, 
1989 George C. Williams, 
1988 Herbert Groves Andrewartha and Louis Charles Birch, 
1987 Archie Carr, 
1986 Evelyn C. Pielou, 
1985 Joseph H. Connell, 
1984 John L. Harper, 
1983 Walles Thomas Edmondson, 
1982 Edward Smith Deevey, Jr., 
1981 Robert H. Whittaker, 
1980 Donald W. Tinkle, 
1979 Rexford F. Daubenmire, 
1978 Samuel Charles Kendeigh, 
1977 Walter Byron McDougall, 
1976 Alton Anthony Lindsey, 
1975 Cornelius Herman Muller, 
1974 Eugene Odum, 
1973 Robert MacArthur, 
1972 Ruth M. Patrick, 
1971 Thomas Park, 
1970 Murray Fife Buell, 
1969 Stanley Adair Cain, 
1968 Victor Ernest Shelford, 
1967 Alfred Edwards Emerson, 
1966 Alfred C. Redfield, 
1965 Paul Bigelow Sears, 
1964 Lee Raymond Dice, 
1963 William Skinner Cooper, 
1962 G. Evelyn Hutchinson, 
1961 Charles S. Elton, 
1960 Walter Pace Cottam, 
1959 Henry Allen Gleason, 
1958 Arthur William Sampson, 
1957 Karl Patterson Schmidt, 
1956 George Burton Rigg, 
1955 Albert Hazen Wright, 
1954 Henry Shoemaker Conard,

See also

 List of ecology awards

References

External links
 Ecological Society of America

Awards established in 1954
Ecology awards
American awards